Gigi Levy-Weiss (born Gigi Levy, Israel, Hebrew: גיגי לוי-וייס) is an Israeli businessman and investor. He works primarily with internet, software and gaming companies. He is currently involved with various startup companies including SimilarWeb, Plarium, myThings, Hola, MyHeritage, and Kenshoo. He is the former CEO for online gambling company 888 Holdings, and is on the board of the Israeli-Palestinian  nonprofit organization MEET, being formerly involved with Latet. In 2014 he co-founded the investment firm and business accelerator NFX Guild. He joined the supervisory board at Bertelsmann SE & Co. KGaA in Germany in May 2015.

Biography
Gigi Levy (later Levy-Weiss) was born and raised in Israel. Before attending college Levy-Weiss was a pilot in the Israeli Air Force. In October 2002 he started attending the Kellogg Graduate School of Management at Northwestern University in Evanston, IL, where he earned his MBA in May 2004.
Levy-Weiss and his wife, Daphi Levy-Weiss, live in  Ramat HaSharon with their three children.

Business career
Early in his career Levy-Weiss worked with his own startup company, also holding a number of management and consulting positions with technology companies in Israel and the UK. Among those roles he was CEO of Giltek Telecommunication, a publicly traded telecom systems integrator.

From 2003 to 2005 he was Vice President of Western Europe for  Amdocs Limited, an international telecommunications software company. The following year he became Division President for the company for Western Europe, and Central and Latin America.

On June 18, 2006, Levy-Weiss joined the company 888 Holdings as their Chief Operating Officer (COO). Founded in 1997, 888 Holdings operates several high-profile gambling websites. He was COO until January 2007, when he became the company's CEO. During his tenure, the company weathered the 2006 enactment of UIGEA and the Global Financial Crisis of 2008. Levy-Weiss pushed the company to focus on online poker rooms and casinos, leading to a number of buyout options. His position as a CEO officially ended on May 31, 2011, though he remained on the board for an additional twelve months, assisting in the transition to a new CEO.

After leaving 888 Holdings, Levy-Weiss has served as an investor, board member, and in some cases a co-founder for a number of technology companies in Israel, San Francisco and London. Many of the startups he invests in have involved online commerce, advertising technologies, mobile applications, gaming, and SaaS spaces.

Since 2007 he has been a board member at MassiveImpact, also serving as a director. He was an investor and board member for SweetIM from 2009 to 2013,  which was acquired by Perion. Perion purchased SweetPacks, maker of SweetIM, in November 2012 for approximately $41 million.

He first invested in Playtika in 2010. In 2011, over half of Playtika's shares were acquired by casino operator Harrah's Entertainment's at a company value of $80–90 million, in what was the largest acquisition on record of an Israeli online gaming company. The total sum of the two stages of the buyout for Playtika was rumored to be around US$140 million.

Israeli company Promodity, an advertising platform, announced in August 2012 that Levy-Weiss had invested in the company. He has been a board member at Global-e since 2013, and late that year he invested in Space Ape Games, an English social games company.

He also has invested in startups such as the technology company Kenshoo. Other investments include companies Crossrider (later acquired for $37million), Plarium, R2Net, Eyeview, RealMatch, Lovelive.tv, NonoRep, Gooodjob, Selina, Superfly, SpeakingPal, Ekoloko, TradeO, Zoomd, Moovu, and Moolta, (which was acquired by SimilarWeb) and Clawee.

In January 2015, he cofounded NFX Guild with James Currier and Stan Chudnovsky, both entrepreneurs and investors based in California. Levy-Weiss is a partner at NFX, which is an accelerator and venture funding firm based in the Silicon Valley in the United States, named for "Network Effects."

Public service

Levy-Weiss has been involved with a number of non-profit organizations in Israel, notably serving on the management board for Israeli humanitarian fund Latet from 2008 to 2013. He became a board member at the non-profit MEET - Middle East Entrepreneurs of Tomorrow in November 2013.

In 2014, Levy-Weiss was appointed to Facebook's EMEA Client Council, a marketing forum including representatives from brands and agencies of Europe, Africa and the Middle East, together with Facebook leaders.

At Tel Aviv University, his alma mater, Levy-Weiss is on the advisory board of the Technology Management, Innovation and Entrepreneurship MBA program. He joined the supervisory board at Bertelsmann SE & Co. KGaA in Germany in May 2015.

He has been a speaker at conferences such as Com.vention, Casual Connect, and others.

References

External links
nfx.com/

Gigi Levy at About.me
Gigi Levy at IMA Ventures

Living people
Angel investors
Israeli business executives
Kellogg School of Management alumni
Tel Aviv University alumni
Year of birth missing (living people)